Toscolano Maderno is a town and comune on the West coast of Lake Garda, in the province of Brescia, in the region of Lombardy, northern Italy.

Located on the Brescian shore of Lake Garda, it includes the two towns of Toscolano, an industrial center, and Maderno, a tourist resort, united into a single comune in 1928. The municipal territory includes the Monte Pizzocolo.

Main sights
 Orto Botanico "G.E. Ghirardi", a research botanical garden
Remains of a Roman villa at Toscolano, with some mosaic pavements
Sanctuary of Supina (late 15th century)

References

Cities and towns in Lombardy
Populated places on Lake Garda